Kenneth Hahn Hall of Administration (abbreviated HOA), formerly the Los Angeles County Hall of Administration, completed 1960, is the seat of the government of the County of Los Angeles, California, and houses the Los Angeles County Board of Supervisors, meeting chambers, and the offices of several County departments. It is located in the Civic Center district of downtown Los Angeles, encompassing a city block bounded by Grand, Temple, Hill, and Grand Park.

On an average workday, 2,700 civil servants occupy the building.

History
The Hall of Administration was originally conceived as part of the 1947 Civic Center Master Plan that ultimately transformed Bunker Hill, as the Civic Center expanded westward. Los Angeles County Courthouse (Stanley Mosk Courthouse), located opposite of the Hall of Administration, was built at the same time, by the same team of architects.

Construction for the Hall of Administration began in 1952 and was completed in 1960. Prior to its construction, Los Angeles County Hall of Records (originally built in 1911, and rebuilt in 1961) housed the Board of Supervisors, as well as other county government entities.

On the night of November 13, 1968, Security Officer Lee Edward Roach was murdered at the Hall of Administration by a former janitorial employee. Officer Roach, of the Los Angeles County Mechanical Department, was guarding payroll warrants on the fifth floor of the building. 

The complex was renamed the Kenneth Hahn Hall of Administration in 1992, in honor of Los Angeles County's longest serving Supervisor, Kenneth Hahn.

Architecture
The Hall of Administration, a 10-story,  complex, is built in the Late Moderne architecture style. The complex was designed by architects Paul R. Williams, Adrian Wilson and the firms Austin, Field & Fry, Stanton & Stockwell. The Hall of Administration sits atop a complex of underground pedestrian tunnels that connect it to other government buildings in Civic Center.

The complex features integrated public art displays, including a pair of sculptures called "The Law Givers," by Albert Stewart, a sculptor. On the second floor lobby stands a bronze bust of Abraham Lincoln, sculpted by Emil Seletz in 1958.

See also

Civic Center, Los Angeles
Grand Park

References

Hahn Hall of Administration
Hahn Hall of Administration
Civic Center, Los Angeles
Hahn Hall of Administration
Hahn Hall of Administration
Government buildings completed in 1960
1960 establishments in California
1960s architecture in the United States
Moderne architecture in California
Stripped Classical architecture in the United States
Paul Williams (architect) buildings
Stanton & Stockwell buildings